Matthew Papali'i To'omua  (born 2 January 1990) is an Australian rugby union professional player who has played over 35 times for  since 2013. He plays for the Melbourne Rebels in Super Rugby and his usual position is at fly-half or inside centre.  He has previously played for the Brumbies in Australia and for Leicester Tigers in England's Premiership Rugby.

Early life
To'omua was born in Melbourne, Victoria to a Samoan father and a New Zealand mother of European origin. To'omua moved to Brisbane where he played his junior football with Logan City and Logan Brothers before attending Brisbane State High School. In 2006 he guided the Queensland II side to their maiden Australian National Schools Championship title, scoring all of his side's points in their 14–13 final win over NSW II in Sydney. Competing against the likes of older flyhalves Kurtley Beale (NSW) and Queensland's Quade Cooper, To'omua was selected in the Australia A side that defeated the Tongan Under 18s, 22–18. Two months later, he captained Queensland Red to the finals of the National Under 16 Championship in Sydney.

Career

To'omua is a fly-half who headed to Canberra as a potential long-term playmaker prospect for the two-time Super Rugby champions. To'omua is a product of Brisbane State High School.

In July 2007 To'omua won his second Australian Schools Championship, guiding Queensland I to a come-from-behind 23–17 win over NSW I in Canberra. His performance during the tournament earned him the pivot's role for the Australian Schoolboys where he helped guide the side to wins over the England Under 18s (11–3), Samoan Schools (50–9) and a 23–17 win over New Zealand Schools in Sydney, the side's first win over their trans-Tasman rivals since 1997.

In 2013, the Brumbies selected To'omua at fly half. In the Brumbies first game of the 2013 Super Rugby season, Lealiifano moved to inside centre; and both To'omua and Lealiifano played the full 80 minutes to help the Brumbies defeat the Reds. During the semi-final clash against the South African team the Bulls at Loftus Versfeld in Pretoria, To'omua help set-up the match-winning try to outside-centre Tevita Kuridrani in the final minutes of the game, helping the Brumbies to win 26–23 which had also guided the team to the Grand Final match against the Chiefs.

After an outstanding Super Rugby season with the Brumbies in 2013, To'omua was selected in the Wallabies 2013 Rugby Championship Squad. On 18 August, he made his Test debut for the Wallabies at Sydney's ANZ Stadium facing the current World Champion All Blacks in the 1st Bledisloe Cup Test (of 2013). He became the first Wallaby debutant player to make his Test debut against the All Blacks in the Wallabies starting XV since Rod Kafer. He was on the field for 60 minutes before being substituted by Quade Cooper.

Following the Sydney Bledisloe Cup game loss, Ewen McKenzie stuck with him at fly-half for the second Bledisloe Cup Test at Westpac Stadium in the New Zealand national capital, Wellington. However, the Wallabies ended-up losing 16–27, and the All Blacks won the Bledisloe Cup (for 2013). The following that game To'omua was benched for the rest of the 2013 Rugby Championship and Quade Cooper claimed the No. 10 fly-half jersey.

On 19 October, To'omua was selected at inside centre for the third Bledisloe Cup clash at Forsyth Barr Stadium in Dunedin. He scored a try at Test level in the game's second half. The Wallabies lost 33–41.

On the Wallabies European spring tour, coach Ewen McKenzie selected him at inside centre for the clashes against England (where he scored the only try for the Wallabies in that game), Italy and Ireland. In the lead-up to the clash against Scotland, To'omua injured his hamstring at training which ruled him out of the rest of the Wallabies final two Spring Tour games.

On 15 November 2015 Leicester Tigers announced the signing of To'omua from the summer of 2016.  He made his debut for Leicester on 14 October 2016 in a 42–13 defeat to Glasgow Warriors, To'omua was sent to the sin bin after 13 minutes for a spear tackle.  To'omua then suffered a serious knee injury in the next game, his first game at Welford Road, which ruled him out for six months.

In August 2018, it was announced that To'omua would return to his hometown to join the Melbourne Rebels after the 2018–19 Premiership Rugby season. Following a disappointing season where Leicester had to fight relegation To'ouma was released early on 13 May 2019 to join the Rebels with immediate effect.

Personal life
To'omua married international cricket and soccer star Ellyse Perry in December 2015. In July 2020, they announced they had separated earlier that year.

Career statistics

References

External links
 Brumbies Profile

1990 births
Living people
Australian sportspeople of Samoan descent
Australian people of New Zealand descent
Australian rugby union players
Australia international rugby union players
ACT Brumbies players
Western Province (rugby union) players
Rugby union fly-halves
Rugby union centres
People educated at Brisbane State High School
Australian expatriate rugby union players
Australian expatriate sportspeople in South Africa
Expatriate rugby union players in South Africa
Leicester Tigers players
Melbourne Rebels players
Australian expatriate sportspeople in England
Expatriate rugby union players in England
Eastern Suburbs players
Rugby union players from Melbourne
Mitsubishi Sagamihara DynaBoars players
Expatriate rugby union players in Japan
Australian expatriate sportspeople in Japan
Rugby union players from Brisbane